John Larry Lolley (October 30, 1945 – February 18, 2018) was an American judge.

Lolley went to Ouachita Parish High School in Monroe, Louisiana. He received his bachelor's degree in government and economics from University of Louisiana at Monroe and his law degree from Loyola University New Orleans College of Law. He practiced law in Monroe, Louisiana and served as the Monroe city attorney. Lolley served in the United States Army and was commissioned a colonel. He served as judge for the Monroe City Court and for the Louisiana District Court. He served on the Louisiana Circuit Courts of Appeals from 2003 until his retirement in 2017.

Notes

1945 births
2018 deaths
People from Monroe, Louisiana
Military personnel from Louisiana
University of Louisiana at Monroe alumni
Loyola University New Orleans College of Law alumni
Louisiana state court judges
20th-century American judges